As one of the oldest Euro-Atlantic member states in the region of Southeast Europe, Greece enjoys a prominent geopolitical role as a middle power, due to its political and geographical proximity to Europe, Asia, the Middle East, Africa, the Americas and Australia. Its main allies are the United States, the United Kingdom, France, Italy, Israel, Cyprus and the rest of the European Union, NATO and UN.

Greece also maintains strong diplomatic relations with Armenia, Albania, Bulgaria, Egypt, Lebanon, the United Arab Emirates, North Macedonia, Saudi Arabia, Serbia, Switzerland, Romania, and Germany while at the same time focuses at improving further the good relations with the Arab World, Caucasus, China, India, South Korea, Japan, Mongolia, Vietnam, The Philippines, South Africa, and the rest of the African Union, Arab League, BRICS, CELAC and Nordic Council. As member of the European Union, the Union for the Mediterranean, and the Council of Europe, Greece is a key player in the eastern Mediterranean region and has encouraged the collaboration between neighbors, as well as promoting the Energy Triangle, for gas exports to Europe. Greece also has the second largest economy in the Balkans, where it is an important regional investor.

Prominent issues in Hellenic foreign policy include the claims in the Aegean Sea and Eastern Mediterranean by Turkey and the Turkish occupation of Cyprus.

Overview 
Greece has diplomatic relations with almost all the countries in the world, as shown in the map below.

Disputes 
Following the resolution of the Macedonia naming dispute with North Macedonia due to the Prespa agreement in 2018, the Ministry identifies two remaining issues of particular importance to the Greek state: Turkish challenges to Greek sovereignty rights in the Aegean Sea and corresponding airspace and the Cyprus dispute involving the Turkish occupation of Northern Cyprus.

Cyprus dispute 

As the island of Cyprus was heading towards independence from the United Kingdom the Greek (82%) and Turkish (18%) communities became embroiled in bitter inter-communal fighting, partly sponsored by the two "motherlands". EOKA-B and the Turkish Resistance Organization (TMT) were responsible for many atrocities which resulted in cementing tensions and led to total isolation of the communities with Turkish Cypriots withdrawn into enclaves.

In 1974, the US-backed Greek junta – in power since 1967 – partly in a move to draw attention away from internal turmoil and partly unsatisfied with Makarios' policy in Cyprus, on 15 July attempted a coup to replace him with Nikos Sampson and declare union with Greece. Seven days later, Turkey launched an invasion of Cyprus allegedly to reinstate the constitution but which resulted in blooded conflict, partition of the island and mass ethnic cleansing. The overwhelming Turkish land, naval and air superiority against island's weak defenses led to the bringing of 37% of the land under Turkish control.

170,000 Greek Cypriots were evicted from their homes in the north with 50,000 Turks following the opposite path concluding the de facto division of Cyprus. In 1983 Turkish Cypriots proclaimed independence unilaterally with only Turkey recognizing them. As of today the north is under an embargo as a measure against the illegal partition of the island.

Ever since both countries along with the two communities of the island are engages into a vicious cycle of negotiations which led to little. In 2004 the Annan Plan for Cyprus was put to vote but whilst it was accepted by the north, it was rejected by the Greek-Cypriots as it meant in their eyes, endorsing a confederal state with a weak central government and considerable local autonomy. The Republic of Cyprus is a constitutional democracy which has reached great levels of prosperity, with a booming economy and good infrastructures, part of the United Nations, European Union and several others organizations by whom it is recognized as the sole legitimate government of the whole island.

Greece calls for the removal of Turkish troops from Cyprus and the restoration of a unified state. The Republic of Cyprus is receiving strong support from Greece in international forums with the latter maintaining a military contingent on the island, and Greek officers filling key positions in the Cypriot National Guard.

Aegean claims by Turkey 

Other issues dividing Greece and Turkey involve the delimitation of the continental shelf in the Aegean Sea, territorial waters and airspace. In March 1987 a dispute concerning oil drilling rights, almost led to war between the countries with Greece advocating the dispute to be decided by the International Court of Justice. In early 1988, the Turkish and Greek Prime Ministers met at Davos, Switzerland, and later in Brussels. They agreed on various measures to reduce bilateral tensions and to encourage cooperation.

Tensions over the Aegean Sea surfaced again in November 1994, when Greece claimed under the Law of the Sea Treaty, which Turkey has not signed, that it reserved the right to declare an expansion of its continental shelf from  around its Aegean islands. Turkey which has itself expanded its continental shelf in the Black Sea shore, stated that it would consider any such action a cause for war. New technical-level bilateral discussions began in 1994 but soon fizzled-out.

In January 1996, Greece and Turkey came close to an armed confrontation over the question of which country had sovereignty over an islet in the Aegean. In July 1997, on the sidelines of the North Atlantic Treaty Organization (NATO) summit in Madrid, Greek and Turkish leaders reached agreement on six principles to govern their bilateral relations. Within a few months, however, the two countries were again at odds over Aegean airspace and sovereignty issues. Tensions remained high for months, although various confidence-building measures were discussed to reduce the risk of military accidents or conflict in the Aegean, under the auspices of the NATO Secretary General.

Turkey and the EU 

Greece has come out in support of Turkey's bid for European Union membership, and supports its full integration to the union when conditions for its acceptance are met. On 6 May 2004, Turkey's Prime Minister Recep Tayyip Erdoğan became the first Turkish leader to visit Greece in fifty years. On 24 January 2008, Greece's premier Costas Karamanlis visited Turkey a full 48 years after the last Greek premier and uncle of his Constantine Karamanlis had visited the neighboring country.

Turkish government arson admission 

On Monday 23 December 2011, in an interview on Turkish newspaper BirGün discussing secret budgets, former Turkish Prime Minister Mesut Yılmaz admitted that Turkish secret agents intentionally started forest fires in Greece between 1995 and 1997 during the Prime Ministership of Tansu Çiller as part of state-sponsored sabotage, resulting in huge damage caused by major forest fires on the islands of the eastern Aegean and in Macedonia. Mesut Yılmaz's admission sparked political outrage in Greece on Monday, causing Greece's Foreign Ministry spokesman Grigoris Delavekouras to say that the claims were "serious and must be investigated," adding that Athens was awaiting a briefing from Ankara. Conservative New Democracy's shadow foreign minister Panos Panayiotopoulos said the revelations "cast heavy shadows over Greek-Turkish relations" and called on Turkey recompense Greece for losses incurred.

Following an official complaint from Greece on 24 December seeking clarification over comments by former Prime Minister Mesut Yılmaz relating to forest fires in Greece in the mid-1990s, the Greek and Turkish foreign ministers, Stavros Dimas and Ahmet Davutoğlu, spoke on Wednesday 28 December. Dimas stressed how important it was that Ankara investigate the claims that in the past Turkey's intelligence services paid arsonists to set fire to forests in Greece. In addition to Greek Foreign Ministry meetings with Turkish officials, Greece's Supreme Court prosecutor Yiannis Tentes launched an emergency inquiry on 27 December, ordering the investigations into the mid-1990s wildfires blamed on arson to be reopened with regard to the initial claims reportedly made by Yılmaz.

Former head of Greek intelligence service Leonidas Vasilikopoulos said they had received information from their agents in Turkey that Turkish agents or others were involved in the forest fires on Greek islands. After making the comments in Turkish daily newspaper BirGün, Yilmaz said that his words had been distorted and that he was referring to Greek agents causing fires in Turkey. However, on Thursday 29, Turkish daily Milliyet published an article referring to a secret report that seemed to support claims made in the interview by Mesut Yılmaz that secret agents had caused forest fires in Greece in the 1990s. According to Milliyet, an associate of Yılmaz's, Kutlu Savas, compiled a 12-page report that detailed the actions of Turkish agents in Greece. It described how the National Intelligence Organization of Turkey (MIT) had formed two teams: one which carried out bombings at tourist sites on Crete and other parts of Greece and another which was responsible for starting the wildfires. An attack on an army camp in Lamia, central Greece, is also mentioned.

Bilateral relations

Africa 

Greece enjoys close historic relations with many members of the African Union, such as South Africa, Sudan, and Ethiopia.

The Americas

Asia 
Greece has a special interest in Middle East and North Africa because of its geographic position and its economic and historic ties to the area. The country cooperated with allied forces during the 1990–1991 Gulf War. Since 1994, Greece has signed defense cooperation agreements with Israel and Egypt and in recent years, Greek leaders have made numerous trips to the region to strengthen bilateral ties and encourage the Middle East Peace Process. In July 1997, December 1997, and July 1998 Greece hosted meetings of Israeli and Palestinian politicians to contribute to the peace process. Greece also maintains diplomatic relations with the General Palestinian Delegation while enjoying cordial relations with Syria.

Europe

Australia and Oceania

Terms

North Macedonia 

Greece rejected the use of the term Macedonia or "Republic of Macedonia" to refer to its northern neighbour after its independence from the former Yugoslavia in 1991. The Greek government opposed the use of the name without any qualification such as 'Republic of Northern Macedonia' to the post-1991 constitutional name of its northern neighbour, citing historical and territorial concerns resulting from the ambiguity between the terms Republic of Macedonia, the Greek region of Macedonia and the ancient kingdom of Macedon, which falls within Greek Macedonia.

Greece also objected to the use of the terms "Macedonian" to denote ethnic Macedonians and the Macedonian language, as these terms have a different meaning in Greece (inhabitants of the Greek region of Macedonia and the Macedonian dialect of Greek). The dispute has escalated to the highest level of international mediation, involving numerous attempts to achieve a resolution, notably by the United Nations.

The provisional reference the former Yugoslav Republic of Macedonia (FYROM) was used in relations involving states which do not recognise the constitutional name, Republic of Macedonia. Nevertheless, all the United Nations member-states have agreed to accept any final agreement resulting from negotiations between the two countries. The dispute has not prevented the two countries from enjoying close trade links and investment levels (especially from Greece), but it has generated a great deal of political and academic debate on both sides.

On 13 September 1995 the two countries signed the Interim Accord, whereby Greece recognized the Republic of Macedonia under its provisional reference. As of August 2011 negotiations aimed at resolving the dispute are ongoing. Under Greek pressure, the European Union and NATO agreed that for the Republic of Macedonia to receive an invitation to join these institutions the name dispute must be resolved first. This resulted in a case at the International Court of Justice against Greece for violation of the Interim Accord. The Court deemed Greece was wrong to block its neighbour's bid to join NATO. No penalties were imposed but the result made it politically more difficult for Greece to object to any of its neighbour's future applications to either NATO or the EU.

On 12 June 2018 the Prespes agreement was signed between the two countries which changed the constitutional name of "Macedonia" to Republic of North Macedonia. Opposition arose in both countries but in the end the agreement was mutually ratified. The Prespes agreement went into force 12 February 2019. Greece officially endorsed North Macedonia's accession to NATO on 15 February 2019, being the first country in the defense alliance to do so.

Northern Epirus 

Northern Epirus is the name used generally by Greeks to refer to the southern part of Albania, home to a Greek minority which after 1989 keeps reducing due to immigration to Greece. The Greek minority was subject to oppression and harassment during Enver Hoxha's communist rule and along with the rest of Albanians was hit hardly by the isolation that the regime imposed and from the economic hardship that followed the fall of communism as well. The treatment of the minority by the Albanian government is strongly linked with the status of Greco-Albanian relations.

The Greek minority is organized under the Unity for Human Rights Party which is the continuation of the former banned party called "Omonoia" (Unity in Greek) and has since 1997 joined the Socialist coalition. At the 1996 Albanian election the Greek minority party received 4.1% of the vote and two seats in parliament. The party leader is Vangjel Dule, while party member Vasilis Bolanos is former mayor of the town of Himara. The party is represented in the ELDR group in the Council of Europe. Strong Greek presence exists in Gjirokastër, Korçë, Sarandë, Himara and the nearby areas. The former CIA director George J. Tenet, Pyrros Dimas, Sotiris Ninis and former Greek president Kostis Stefanopoulos have ancestral links to the Greek minority.

The situation of the Greeks in Albania is closely tied to the socio-political ties of the two countries. At times differences between Athens and Tirana regarding the rights and position of the minority has led to tense relations. The community, alongside the Albanian communities in Greece are hailed as a bridge of friendship between the two countries.

Ecumenical Patriarchate of Constantinople 

The Ecumenical Patriarchate of Constantinople, protected under the treaty of Lausanne is a point of controversy between Greece and Turkey as the latter refuses to recognize the Ecumenical character of the Patriarchate thus requiring the Patriarch himself to be a Turkish citizen. Moreover, the biggest part of the Patriarchate's property – known as Vakoufia – had been confiscated by Turkish authorities and the Theological school of Halki, the traditional school out of which the Eastern Orthodox Church draws its clergy, has been closed since 1971. To no avail numerous Greek, European Union and USA officials have criticized Turkey's attitude and even president Bill Clinton during his visit in Greece asked for the theological school to open. During Greek prime-minister's Kostas Karamanlis historic visit to Turkey in 2007, Recep Tayyip Erdoğan promised to reconsider his country's stance on the matter.

Black Sea 
The Black Sea is a region heavily colonized by Greeks throughout history. It used to have a significant presence of Greeks up until the population exchange between Greece and Turkey in 1923. Nowadays there remains Greek presence on the shores of Black Sea mainly in Mariupol (Ukraine), Crimea, Russia and Georgia despite emigration to Greece during and after the dissolution of Soviet Union. Today Greeks in the region are estimated to be around 215,000 according to official Greek diaspora figures. Greece is a founding member of the Organization of the Black Sea Economic Cooperation.

International organization participation 
Greece is a major participant in most large-scale international bodies, with the geographic significance of the region proving advantageous for diplomatic, trade and political crossroads.

In 1967, Denmark, Norway, Sweden, and the Netherlands brought the Greek Case against the Greek junta regime for human rights violations. As a result, Greece left the Council of Europe in 1969, returning in 1976. It was the only country to have left the Council of Europe up until 2022 when Russia also left.

BIS, BSEC, CCC, CE, EAPC, EBRD, ECA (associate), ECE, ECLAC, EIB, EMU, EU, FAO, IAEA, IBRD, ICAO, IDA, IEA, IFAD, IFC, ILO, IMF, International Maritime Organization, Interpol, IOC, IOM, ISO, NATO, OECD, OSCE, UN, UN Security Council, UNCTAD, UNESCO, UNHCR, WEU, WHO, WIPO, WMO.

Greece was elected by the United Nations General Assembly to the United Nations Security Council, on 15 October 2004, as a non-permanent member for 2005 and 2006.

See also 
 List of diplomatic missions in Greece
 List of diplomatic missions of Greece
 List of ministries of Greece
 Foreign relations of the European Union

References

Further reading

External links 
 Greece's foreign policy , via the Greek Ministry of Foreign affairs
 Ethnic groups in Albania, via CIA – The World Factbook
 Greek Ministry of Foreign Affairs